Desert Falcons is a board game expansion published in 1988 by Game Designers' Workshop.

Contents
Desert Falcons is the second expansion module to the Air Superiority air combat game and gives more aircraft types and rule options.

Reception
Lee Brimmicombe-Wood reviewed Desert Falcons for Games International magazine, and gave it 4 stars out of 5, and stated that "For the fervent Air Superiority fan this is an essential buy and I unhesitatingly recommend it, although I suspect that the casual gamer might find the new rules and primitive jets depicted only of passing interest."

Reviews
Fire & Movement #67

References

Board games introduced in 1988
Game Designers' Workshop games